The 2019 USA Sevens (also sometimes referred to as the 2019 Las Vegas Sevens) is the sixteenth edition of the USA Sevens tournament, and the sixth tournament of the 2018–19 World Rugby Sevens Series. The tournament was played  March 1–3, 2019 at Sam Boyd Stadium in Las Vegas, Nevada.

In January 2019, it was reported that the 2019 USA Sevens would be the last in Las Vegas, with the event moving to an unknown city starting from 2020. Possible options are San Diego, which had been home to the USA Sevens before it moved to Las Vegas; San Francisco, which hosted the 2018 Rugby World Cup Sevens; and Miami in Florida. Among the reported reasons included the uncertain status of Sam Boyd Stadium with the upcoming stadium not due to be ready until summer 2020, poor living environment at the team hotels (the stadium is far distant from the main tourist area of the Las Vegas Strip), and safety concerns due to an unusually narrow pitch with team benches very close to the touchlines (Sam Boyd Stadium is built for American football, a sport with a playing field about 20 metres narrower than a standard rugby pitch). The stadium's normal pitch is artificial turf, which raised even more safety concerns in the early years of the event's run in Las Vegas, but temporary grass pitches were used in the 2017, 2018 and 2019 events.

Format
The teams are drawn into four pools of four teams each. Each team plays every other team in their pool once. The top two teams from each pool advance to the Cup bracket where teams compete for the Gold, Silver, and Bronze Medals. The bottom two teams from each group go to the Challenge Trophy bracket.

Teams
Fifteen core teams played in the tournament along with one invitational team, the winner of the 2019 Sudamérica Rugby Sevens, Chile:

Pool stage
All times in Pacific Standard Time (UTC−08:00). The pools were scheduled as follows:

Pool A

Pool B

Pool C

Pool D

Knockout stage

Thirteenth place

Challenge Trophy

5th place

Cup

Tournament placings

Source: World Rugby

Players

Scoring leaders

Source: World Rugby

Dream Team
The following seven players were selected to the tournament Dream Team at the conclusion of the tournament:

References

External links
Tournament page 
World Rugby page

2019
USA Sevens 2019
USA Sevens
USA Sevens
USA Sevens
USA Sevens